This is a list of earthquakes in the Dominican Republic

Earthquakes

See also 
 List of earthquakes in Haiti
 List of earthquakes in Puerto Rico

References

Dominican Republic
Earthquakes in the Dominican Republic
Earthquakes
Earthquakes